Nikola Valentić (Serbian Cyrillic: Никола Валентић; born September 6, 1983) is a Serbian former footballer.

Career
Born in Čapljina, SR Bosnia and Herzegovina, Valentić started his career at OFK Beograd as youth team member before moving to FK Voždovac in 2002. Valentić the signed for Bnei Sakhnin in Israel in 2006 before quickly moving on to Anzhi Makhachkala in Russia. Valentić signed for Alania Vladikavkaz in 2009, getting voted the club's best player,  before joining Sibir Novosibirsk in 2010. Valentić returned to Serbia in the summer of 2012, joining FK Jagodina before signing with Azerbaijan Premier League team Gabala in January 2013. After Valentić's Gabala contract expired, he returned to Jagodina.

Career statistics

References

External links
 
  Statistics at Sportbox.ru

1983 births
Living people
People from Čapljina
Serbs of Bosnia and Herzegovina
Serbian footballers
Serbian expatriate footballers
Association football defenders
OFK Beograd players
FK Voždovac players
FK Srem players
Bnei Sakhnin F.C. players
FC Anzhi Makhachkala players
FC Spartak Vladikavkaz players
FC Sibir Novosibirsk players
FK Jagodina players
FK Radnički Niš players
Expatriate footballers in Israel
Expatriate footballers in Russia
Russian Premier League players
Serbian SuperLiga players
Gabala FC players
FK Inđija players
FK Bežanija players
FK Sinđelić Beograd players
Uzbekistan Super League players
Serbian expatriate sportspeople in Russia
Serbian expatriate sportspeople in Azerbaijan
Expatriate footballers in Azerbaijan
Serbian expatriate sportspeople in Uzbekistan
Expatriate footballers in Uzbekistan